The 2022–23 Minnesota Timberwolves season is the 34th season for the franchise in the National Basketball Association (NBA).

Draft 

The Timberwolves owned their first round pick and had three second-round selections. On June 23, 2022, the Timberwolves traded the draft rights to Kendall Brown to the Indiana Pacers in exchange for cash considerations and a 2026 second round selection.

Roster

Standings

Division

Conference

Game log

Preseason 

|-style="background:#cfc;
| 1
| October 4
| @ Miami
| 
| Anthony Edwards (24)
| Nathan Knight (7)
| Jordan McLaughlin (5)
| FTX Arena19,600
| 1–0
|-style="background:#cfc;
| 2
| October 6
| L.A. Lakers
| 
| Edwards, Russell, Nowell (13)
| Rudy Gobert (12)
| Jordan McLaughlin (6)
| T-Mobile Arena7,311
| 2–0
|-style="background:#cfc;
| 3
| October 9
| @ L.A. Clippers
| 
| Naz Reid (20)
| Naz Reid (11)
| Towns, Russell, McLaughlin (6)
| Crypto.com Arena16,466
| 3–0
|-style="background:#cfc;
| 4
| October 12
| @ L.A. Lakers
| 
| Naz Reid (22)
| Naz Reid (13)
| D'Angelo Russell (8)
| Crypto.com Arena18,754
| 4–0
|-style="background:#fcc;
| 5
| October 14
| Brooklyn
| 
| D'Angelo Russell (17)
| Karl-Anthony Towns (9)
| D'Angelo Russell (6)
| Target Center12,787
| 5–1

Regular season

|-  style="background:#cfc;"
| 1
| October 19
| Oklahoma City
| 
| Rudy Gobert (23)
| Rudy Gobert (16)
| Towns, Edwards (7)
| Target Center17,136
| 1–0
|-style="background:#fcc;
| 2
| October 21
| Utah
| 
| Anthony Edwards (30)
| Rudy Gobert (23)
| D'Angelo Russell (7)
| Target Center17,136
| 1–1
|-  style="background:#cfc;"
| 3
| October 23
| @ Oklahoma City
| 
| Anthony Edwards (30)
| Rudy Gobert (15)
| D'Angelo Russell (6)
| Paycom Center15,044
| 2–1
|-  style="background:#fcc;"
| 4
| October 24
| San Antonio
| 
| Karl-Anthony Towns (27)
| Karl-Anthony Towns (11)
| D'Angelo Russell (7)
| Target Center15,347
| 2–2
|-  style="background:#cfc;"
| 5
| October 26
| @ San Antonio
| 
| Anthony Edwards (34)
| Rudy Gobert (9)
| Edwards, Russell (9)
| Target Center16,165
| 3–2
|-style="background:#cfc"
| 6
| October 28
| L.A. Lakers
| 
| Anthony Edwards (29)
| Rudy Gobert (21)
| Towns, Russell (7)
| Target Center17,136
| 4–2
|-style="background:#fcc;
| 7
| October 30
| San Antonio
| 
| Karl-Anthony Towns (26)
| Rudy Gobert (12)
| Anthony Edwards (6)
| AT&T Center15,051
| 4–3

|-style="background:#fcc;
| 8
| November 1
| @ Phoenix
| 
| Edwards, Towns (24)
| Karl-Anthony Towns (10)
| Karl-Anthony Towns (7)
| Footprint Center17,071
| 4–4
|-style="background:#fcc;
| 9
| November 4
| Milwaukee
| 
| Anthony Edwards (24)
| Rudy Gobert (13)
| Karl-Anthony Towns (5)
| Target Center17,136
| 4–5
|-style="background:#cfc;
| 10
| November 5
| Houston
| 
| Karl-Anthony Towns (25)
| Karl-Anthony Towns (9)
| Jordan McLaughlin (11)
| Target Center16,412
| 5–5
|-style="background:#fcc;
| 11
| November 7
| New York
| 
| Karl-Anthony Towns (25)
| Karl-Anthony Towns (13)
| D'Angelo Russell (8)
| Target Center14,524
| 5–6
|-style="background:#fcc;"
| 12
| November 9
| Phoenix
| 
| Rudy Gobert (25)
| Rudy Gobert (11)
| Edwards, Russell (6)
| Target Center16,062
| 5–7
|-style="background:#fcc;"
| 13
| November 11
| @ Memphis
| 
| Anthony Edwards (28)
| Karl-Anthony Towns (10)
| D'Angelo Russell (8)
| FedExForum16,939
| 5–8
|-style="background:#cfc;"
| 14
| November 14
| @ Cleveland
| 
| D'Angelo Russell (30)
| Karl-Anthony Towns (13)
| D'Angelo Russell (12)
| Rocket Mortgage FieldHouse19,432
| 6–8
|-style="background:#cfc;"
| 15
| November 16
| @ Orlando
| 
| Anthony Edwards (35)
| Edwards, McDaniels, Towns (8)
| Edwards, Russell (6)
| Amway Center16,527
| 7–8
|-style="background:#cfc;"
| 16
| November 19
| @ Philadelphia
| 
| Anthony Edwards (25)
| Rudy Gobert (13)
| D'Angelo Russell (7)
| Wells Fargo Center20,515
| 8–8
|-style="background:#cfc;"
| 17
| November 21
| Miami
| 
| Karl-Anthony Towns (25)
| Rudy Gobert (9)
| Karl-Anthony Towns (9)
| Target Center16,583
| 9–8
|-style="background:#cfc;"
| 18
| November 23
| @ Indiana
| 
| Karl-Anthony Towns (23)
| Rudy Gobert (16)
| D'Angelo Russell (12)
| Gainbridge Fieldhouse15,751
| 10–8
|-style="background:#fcc;"
| 19
| November 25
| @ Charlotte
| 
| Anthony Edwards (25)
| Rudy Gobert (17)
| D'Angelo Russell (10)
| Spectrum Center17,924
| 10–9
|-style="background:#fcc;"
| 20
| November 27
| Golden State
| 
| Anthony Edwards (26)
| Rudy Gobert (10)
| D'Angelo Russell (6)
| Target Center17,136
| 10–10
|-style="background:#fcc;"
| 21
| November 28
| @ Washington
| 
| Anthony Edwards (29)
| Anderson, Edwards (8)
| D'Angelo Russell (5)
| Capital One Arena13,515
| 10–11
|-style="background:#cfc;"
| 22
| November 30
| Memphis
| 
| Anthony Edwards (29)
| Kyle Anderson (6)
| D'Angelo Russell (10)
| Target Center15,980
| 11–11

|-style="background:#fcc;"
| 23
| December 3
| Oklahoma City
| 
| D'Angelo Russell (27)
| Naz Reid (18)
| D'Angelo Russell (6)
| Target Center17,136
| 11–12
|-style="background:#cfc;"
| 24
| December 7
| Indiana
| 
| D'Angelo Russell (28)
| Rudy Gobert (21)
| Anthony Edwards (8)
| Target Center15,472
| 12–12
|-style="background:#cfc;
| 25
| December 9
| @ Utah
| 
| D'Angelo Russell (30)
| Rudy Gobert (13)
| Kyle Anderson (12)
| Vivint Arena18,206
| 13–12
|-style="background:#fcc;
| 26
| December 10
| @ Portland
| 
| Anthony Edwards (26)
| Rudy Gobert (9)
| Anthony Edwards (7)
| Moda Center18,324
| 13–13
|-style="background:#fcc;"
| 27
| December 12
| @ Portland
| 
| D'Angelo Russell (23)
| Rudy Gobert (20)
| D'Angelo Russell (8)
| Moda Center18,021
| 13–14
|-style=background:#fcc;"
| 28
| December 14
| @ L.A. Clippers
| 
| Anthony Edwards (19)
| Rudy Gobert (13)
| Kyle Anderson (5)
| Crypto.com Arena14,068
| 13–15
|-style="background:#cfc;"
| 29
| December 16 
| @ Oklahoma City
| 
| Naz Reid (28)
| Anthony Edwards (11)
| Anthony Edwards (7)
| Paycom Center14,885
| 14–15
|-style="background:#cfc;"
| 30
| December 18
| Chicago
| 
| Anthony Edwards (37)
| Jaden McDaniels (8)
| Anthony Edwards (11)
| Target Center16,294
| 15–15
|-style="background:#cfc;"
| 31
| December 19
| Dallas
| 
| Edwards, Reid (27)
| Edwards, Reid (13)
| Anthony Edwards (9)
| Target Center16,627
| 16–15
|-style="background:#fcc;"
| 32
| December 21
| Dallas
| 
| Anthony Edwards (23)
| Rudy Gobert (15)
| D'Angelo Russell (8)
| Target Center16,164
| 16–16
|-style="background:#fcc;"
| 33
| December 23
| @ Boston
| 
| Anthony Edwards (30)
| Rudy Gobert (12)
| D'Angelo Russell (10)
| TD Garden19,156
| 16–17
|-style="background:#fcc;"
| 34
| December 26
| @ Miami
| 
| Anthony Edwards (29)
| Naz Reid (11)
| D'Angelo Russell (8)
| FTX Arena19,911
| 16–18
|-style="background:#fcc;"
| 35
| December 28
| @ New Orleans
| 
| Edwards, Russell (27)
| Rudy Gobert (8)
| D'Angelo Russell (4)
| Smoothie King Center18,669
| 16–19
|-style="background:#fcc;"
| 36
| December 30
| @ Milwaukee
| 
| Anthony Edwards (30)
| Anthony Edwards (10)
| D'Angelo Russell (7)
| Fiserv Forum18,018
| 16–20
|-style="background:#fcc;"
| 37
| December 31
| Detroit
| 
| Anthony Edwards (30)
| Rudy Gobert (10)
| Edwards, Russell (5)
| Target Center16,233
| 16–21

|-style="background:#cfc;"
| 38
| January 2
| Denver
| 
| Anthony Edwards (29)
| Anthony Edwards (10)
| Kyle Anderson (8)
| Target Center15,962
| 17–21
|-style="background:#cfc;"
| 39
| January 4
| Portland
| 
| Anthony Edwards (32)
| Rudy Gobert (12)
| D'Angelo Russell (7)
| Target Center15,434
| 18–21
|-style=background:#cfc;"
| 40
| January 6
| L.A. Clippers
| 
| Rudy Gobert (25)
| Rudy Gobert (21)
| Anderson, Nowell (6)
| Target Center17,136
| 19–21
|-style=background:#cfc;"
| 41
| January 8
| @ Houston
| 
| D'Angelo Russell (22)
| Rudy Gobert (11)
| Anderson, Russell (6)
| Toyota Center18,055
| 20–21
|-style="background:#fcc;"
| 42
| January 11
| @ Detroit
| 
| Anthony Edwards (20)
| Rudy Gobert (14)
| Anthony Edwards (6)
| Little Caesars Arena15,906
| 20–22
|-style="background:#cfc;"
| 43
| January 13
| Phoenix
| 
| Anthony Edwards (31)
| Rudy Gobert (12)
| Jaden McDaniels (6)
| Target Center16,460
| 21–22
|-style="background:#cfc;"
| 44
| January 14
| Cleveland
| 
| Anthony Edwards (26)
| Naz Reid (7)
| Anthony Edwards (7)
| Target Center17,136
| 22–22
|-style="background:#fcc;"
| 45
| January 16
| Utah
|  
| Anthony Edwards (29)
| Kyle Anderson (11)
| Kyle Anderson (10)
| Target Center16,477
| 22–23
|-style="background:#fcc;"
| 46
| January 18
| @ Denver
| 
| Jaden McDaniels (18)
| Kyle Anderson (11)
| Kyle Anderson (8)
| Ball Arena16,112
| 22–24
|-style="background:#cfc;"
| 47
| January 19
| Toronto
| 
| D'Angelo Russell (25)
| Kyle Anderson (10)
| Anthony Edwards (7)
| Target Center16,318
| 23–24
|-style=background:#cfc;"
| 48
| January 21
| Houston
| 
| Anthony Edwards (44) 
| Kyle Anderson (7)
| D'Angelo Russell (8)
| Target Center17,136
| 24–24
|-style=background:#fcc;"
| 49
| January 23
| @ Houston
| 
| Anthony Edwards (31) 
| Rudy Gobert (16)
| D'Angelo Russell (7)
| Toyota Center13,811
| 24–25
|-style=background:#cfc;"
| 50
| January 25
| @ New Orleans
| 
| Anthony Edwards (37) 
| Rudy Gobert (12)
| Kyle Anderson (7)
| Smoothie King Center14,877
| 25–25
|-style="background:#cfc;"
| 51
| January 27
| Memphis
| 
| Anthony Edwards (25)
| Rudy Gobert (13)
| Edwards, Russell (7)
| Target Center17,136
| 26–25
|-style="background:#cfc;"
| 52
| January 28
| Sacramento
| 
| Anthony Edwards (34)
| Rudy Gobert (14)
| Edwards, Russell (6)
| Target Center17,136
| 27–25
|-style="background:#fcc;"
| 53
| January 30
| Sacramento
| 
| Anthony Edwards (33)
| Rudy Gobert (14)
| D'Angelo Russell (7)
| Target Center15,342
| 27–26

|-style="background:#cfc;"
| 54
| February 1
| Golden State
| 
| D'Angelo Russell (29)
| Naz Reid (13)
| Edwards, Rivers (5)
| Target Center17,136
| 28–26
|-style="background:#fcc;"
| 55
| February 3
| Orlando
| 
| D'Angelo Russell (29)
| D'Angelo Russell (10)
| D'Angelo Russell  (6)
| Target Center17,136
| 28–27
|-style="background:#cfc;"
| 56
| February 5
| Denver
| 
| Anthony Edwards (20)
| Rudy Gobert (8)
| D'Angelo Russell  (10)
| Target Center17,136
| 29–27
|-style="background:#fcc;"
| 57
| February 7
| @ Denver
| 
| Edwards, Garza (19)
| Luka Garza (9)
| Wendell Moore Jr. (5)
| Ball Arena18,307
| 29–28
|-style="background:#cfc;"
| 58
| February 8
| @ Utah
| 
| Anthony Edwards (31)
| Josh Minott (11)
| Anthony Edwards (8)
| Vivint Arena18,206
| 30–28
|-style="background:#fcc;"
| 59
| February 10
| @ Memphis
| 
| Jaylen Nowell (21)
| Rudy Gobert (10)
| Anthony Edwards (5)
| FedEx Forum17,794
| 30–29
|-style="background:#cfc;"
| 60
| February 13
| @ Dallas
| 
| Anthony Edwards (32)
| Rudy Gobert (14)
| Mike Conley Jr. (9)
| American Airlines Center20,325
| 31–29
|-style="background:#fcc;"
| 61
| February 16
| Washington
| 
| Anthony Edwards (34)
| Rudy Gobert (19)
| Kyle Anderson (8)
| Target Center17,136
| 31–30
|-style="background:#fcc;"
| 62
| February 24
| Charlotte
| 
| Anthony Edwards (29)
| Rudy Gobert (10)
| Kyle Anderson (6)
| Target Center17,136
| 31–31
|-style="background:#fcc;"
| 63
| February 26
| @ Golden State
| 
| Naz Reid (30)
| Anderson, Reid (9)
| Conley Jr., Edwards (7)
| Chase Center18,064
| 31–32
|-style="background:#cfc;"
| 64
| February 28
| @ L.A. Clippers
| 
| Jaden McDaniels (20)
| Kyle Anderson (10)
| Mike Conley Jr. (7)
| Crypto.com Arena17,022
| 32–32

|-style="background:#cfc;"
| 65
| March 3
| @ L.A. Lakers
| 
| Rudy Gobert (22)
| Rudy Gobert (14)
| Jordan McLaughlin (6)
| Crypto.com Arena18,997
| 33–32
|-style="background:#cfc;"
| 66
| March 4
| @ Sacramento
| 
| Anthony Edwards (27)
| Rudy Gobert (14)
| Kyle Anderson (9)
| Golden 1 Center18,111
| 34–32
|-style="background:#fcc;"
| 67
| March 7
| Philadelphia
| 
| Anthony Edwards (32)
| Rudy Gobert (9)
| Conley Jr., McLaughlin, Reid (3)
| Target Center17,136
| 34–33
|-style="background:#fcc;"
| 68
| March 10
| Brooklyn
| 
| Anthony Edwards (32)
| Rudy Gobert (13)
| Kyle Anderson (11)
| Target Center17,136
| 34–34
|-style="background:#cfc;"
| 69
| March 13
| @ Atlanta
| 
| Anthony Edwards (32)
| Kyle Anderson (10)
| Kyle Anderson (12)
| State Farm Arena17,799
| 35–34
|-style="background:#fcc;"
| 70
| March 15
| Boston
| 
| Anthony Edwards (28)
| Anthony Edwards (10)
| Kyle Anderson (8)
| Target Center17,136
| 35–35
|-style="background:#fcc;"
| 71
| March 17
| @ Chicago
| 
| Mike Conley Jr. (28)
| Rudy Gobert (19)
| Kyle Anderson (12)
| United Center20,109
| 35–36
|-style="background:#fcc;"
| 72
| March 18
| @ Toronto
|  
| Naz Reid (22)
| Rudy Gobert (12)
| Jordan McLaughlin (8)
| Scotiabank Arena19,800
| 35–37
|-
| 73
| March 20
| @ New York
|  
| 
|
|
| Madison Square Garden 
|  
|-
| 74
| March 22
| Atlanta
|  
| 
|
|
| Target Center
|  
|-
| 75
| March 26
| @ Golden State
|  
| 
|
|
| Chase Center 
|  
|-
| 76
| March 27
| @ Sacramento
|  
| 
|
|
| Golden 1 Center
|  
|-
| 77
| March 29
| @ Phoenix
|  
| 
|
|
| Footprint Center 
|  
|-
| 78
| March 31
| L.A. Lakers
|  
| 
|
|
| Target Center
|  
|-

Transactions

Trades

Free agency

Re-signed

Additions

References 

Minnesota Timberwolves seasons
Minnesota Timberwolves
Minnesota Timberwolves
Minnesota Timberwolves